"Asia no Junshin" (Japanese: アジアの純真, lit. "Asia's Innocence" or "True Asia") is a song recorded by the Japanese pop rock duo Puffy, released in May 1996 as their debut single. It was produced and composed by Tamio Okuda, with lyrics written by Yōsui Inoue.

Cover versions
Yōsui Inoue and Tamio Okuda, composers of "Asia no Junshin" recorded the song on their collaborative album Shopping released in 1997.
German band Gigantor covered the song on their 1999 album Back to the Rockets.
The Ventures covered the song on their 2005 album J-Rock Summer Wind (Melodies in Memories). They sung an English version of it on their album An Illustrated History.
Junko Ohashi recorded the song on her 2007 cover album Terra 2.
MAX covered the song on their 2010 cover album Be MAX.
Bahashishi covered the song on their 2011 album Luminescence.

Track listing  (3-inch CD single)

Chart positions

Certifications

Awards

References

Puffy AmiYumi songs
1996 singles
Japanese-language songs
Songs written by Tamio Okuda
Songs written by Yōsui Inoue
1996 songs
Epic Records singles